Albany Transitional Center is located in Albany, Georgia in Dougherty County, Georgia. The facility houses 150 adult male felons, it was constructed in 1906. It was renovated in 1990 and re-opened in 1991. It is a minimum-security prison.

References
Georgia Department of Corrections

Buildings and structures in Albany, Georgia
Prisons in Georgia (U.S. state)
1906 establishments in Georgia (U.S. state)